Canadians are people identified with the country of Canada.

Canadian also commonly refers to:

 Something of, from, or related to Canada, a country
Canadian cuisine
Canadian English

Canadian may also refer to:

Geography

Rivers
Canadian River, United States, the largest tributary of the Arkansas River, in the southwestern United States
Canadian River (Colorado), United States, a tributary of the North Platte River
North Canadian River, United States, originating in northeast New Mexico

Cities
Canadian, Oklahoma, United States, a town in Pittsburg County
Canadian County, Oklahoma, United States
Canadian, Texas, United States, a city in Hemphill County
Canadian Lakes, Michigan, United States, an unincorporated community located in Mecosta County
Canadian, Victoria, 3350 Australia

Other uses
Canadian (canoe), a kind of canoe
The Canadian (train), a Canadian transcontinental passenger train with service between Toronto and Vancouver
Canadian (NYC train), an earlier international passenger train with service first between Chicago and Montreal
Canadian Airlines, a defunct airline of Canada
Canadian horse, a breed of horse, an official Canadian animal symbol
Canadian, a type of bet covering five selections and also known as a "Super Yankee"
The Canadian (film), a 1926 American silent film
Molson Canadian, a popular brand of beer produced by Molson Coors Brewing Company
Sherbrooke Canadians, a minor-league baseball team during the 1946 season

See also

Canadien
Montreal Canadiens, an NHL hockey team
Canadiana
Canadien (disambiguation)
Canada (disambiguation)

Language and nationality disambiguation pages